Government Tolaram College is now Government Tolaram University College. Tolaram College Narayanganj, Bangladesh was founded in 1937 by Khagendro Nath Chokroborti, who also served as its first principal. The college had an initial intake of five students. It is situated at the center of Narayanganj near Chashara. The college offers honors and masters program and is governed under the authority of the National University of Bangladesh. Students passing the HSC exam for science, business studies and humanities can get admitted into the college through an admission test held by the national university every year.

History
In 1937, famous educationist Khagendra Nath Chakraborty of Narayanganj established Tolaram College. He was the founder principal of this college. At its inception, he started classes with just five students. In order to establish an educational institution, Khagendra Nath visited Danbir 'Randa Prasad Saha' of Mirzapur in present day Tangail district of Greater Mymensingh. On hearing about the education-related plans, Randa Prasad Saha donated twenty-five thousand rupees for the college. After that, Tolaram Saraogi's son 'Madan Lal Saraogi', of Tolaram Bachhraj, a jute merchant of Narayanganj, also donated twenty five thousand rupees for the establishment of the college. With this money Khagendra Nath built 'Narayanganj Women's College'. The girls' college was closed when World War II broke out.

After the war, Khagendra Nath took the initiative to start the college again. He was supported by education promoter and philanthropist Tolaram Saraogi of jute merchant 'Tolaram Bachhraj', who donated one lakh rupees to build the college. 'Tolaram College' was started in the abandoned gymnasium of Narayanganj High School in 1948 and named after the donor. Teaching started in 1956 after purchasing land on 'Allama Iqbal Road' and constructing a one storied building. The building was inaugurated by the then Chief Minister of East Bengal 'Abu Hussain Sarkar'. The founder and principal of the college was Khagendranath Chakraborty. The original multi-storied building of the present college was constructed in 1963 AD. With a donation of 1.5 lakh rupees from RP Saha (Randaprasad Saha), the science laboratory of Tolaram College was built and necessary equipment was purchased.

Tolaram College was the first outside Dhaka to get approval from Dhaka University in 1946. Since the 1960s, Tolaram College has been running an evening department for working students. In 1974, the operation of the night department was stopped. From the very beginning, the final examination results of the students of this college were also satisfactory

In 1956, the students of 'Tolaram College' visited India and Pakistan. In 1966, college students staged plays 'Shahjahan' and 'Mahua' at 'Diamond Cinema Hall'. In 1963 'Chhatrasansaad' gained fame by publishing daily magazine and annual magazine. A sensational science fair was held in this college in 1969.

Abdul Awal, a graduate student of Tolaram College, was martyred in the Liberation War.

The college was nationalized on March 1, 1980. With the efforts and cooperation of former student of Tolaram College and former Member of Parliament Mr. Shamim Osman, Honors in 12 subjects and MA courses in 05 subjects were opened in Government Tolaram College in 1996-97 session. On his announcement, the art building of the college was named "Shaheed Janani Jahanara Imam Bhavan". Presently the college offers HSC, BA (Pass), Honors in 14 subjects, M.A. first part in 05 subjects and M.A. final part in 14 subjects. At present the number of students studying in 'Government Tolaram College' is about 18000.

Government Tolaram College' also has co-educational program. The college conducts indoor games, outdoor games, annual milad, annual banquet and educational tours. Rover Scouts, BNCC and Girlsing Rovers of the college regularly participate in various social service activities. Government Tolaram College was awarded as the best college at national level in 1998 due to good results.

Academic departments

 Department of Economics
 Department of Bengali
 Department of English
 Department of Physics
 Department of Chemistry
 Department of Mathematics
 Department of Zoology
 Department of Botany
 Department of Accounting
 Department of Management
 Department of Political Science
 Department of Islamic History and Culture
 Department of Philosophy
 Department of Sociology

Library
There are available Library facility for students. Around 14,500 books are in the library in various department.

Residential student halls

There are Two (02) residential halls:
 Sher-E-Bangla Boys Hall.(Boys)
 University College abarest Girls Hall.(Girls)

Transport

Tolaram University college has 02 buses to transport students from different areas of Narayanganj city.

References

External links
 Official website Government Tolaram University College
 

Colleges in Narayanganj District
Universities and colleges in Narayanganj District
1937 establishments in India